The Ministry of Women's Affairs is a government ministry responsible for women affairs in Cambodia. It was established in 1993 as the Ministry of Women and Veterans' Affairs. Its minister since 2004 is Dr. Ing Kuntha Phavi.

Departments
Department of Administration and Staff
Department of Finance and Supply
Department of Planning and Statistic
Department of International Cooperation
Department of Information
Department of Gender Equality
Department of Economic Development
Department of Legal Protection
Department of Women and Health
Department of Women and Education
Department of Internal Audit 
Source: Organization chart

See also
Government of Cambodia
Cabinet of Cambodia
 

Government ministries of Cambodia
Phnom Penh
Ministries established in 1993
1993 establishments in Cambodia
Women's ministries
Women in Cambodia
Women's rights in Cambodia